Philip Philpott (5 September 1859 – 27 July 1934) was a New Zealand cricketer. He played in one first-class match for Canterbury in 1881/82.

See also
 List of Canterbury representative cricketers

References

External links
 

1859 births
1934 deaths
New Zealand cricketers
Canterbury cricketers
Cricketers from Christchurch